Malcolm Island Airport  is a registered aerodrome located on Hydiak Island, Reindeer Lake, Saskatchewan, Canada.

Construction began in 1959 by Fred Lockhart and was completed in 1965, having taken place over six summer seasons.

The airstrip is owned and operated by Arctic Lodges Ltd, which operates a fly-in/fly-out fishing lodge on Dewdney Island,  to the north-west.

Malcolm Island is the large island to the east.

Accidents and incidents 
On 10 July 1969, a privately operated Douglas DC-3 N139D crashed on take-off due to the failure to remove control locks before flight was attempted. All 25 people on board survived. The aircraft was operating an international non-scheduled passenger flight to Duluth International Airport, Minnesota, United States.

See also 
 List of airports in Saskatchewan

References 

Registered aerodromes in Saskatchewan